The 1960 Northwest Territories general election took place on September 19, 1960.

In this election three members of the general public were randomly chosen and appointed to the council.

Appointed members

Elected members
For complete electoral history, see individual districts

References 

1960 elections in Canada
Elections in the Northwest Territories
September 1960 events in Canada
1960 in the Northwest Territories